In mathematics, in particular homotopy theory, a continuous mapping

,

This type of structure can be encoded with the technical condition of having the homotopy extension property with respect to all spaces . This definition is dual to that of a fibration, which is required to satisfy the homotopy lifting property with respect to all spaces. This duality is informally referred to as Eckmann–Hilton duality. Because of the generality this technical condition is stated, it can be used in model categories.

Definition

Homotopy theory 
In what follows, let  denote the unit interval.

Cofibrant objects 
For a model category , such as for pointed topological spaces, an object  is called cofibrant if the map  is a cofibration. Note that in the category of pointed topological spaces, the notion of cofibration coincides with the previous definition assuming the maps are pointed maps of topological spaces.

Examples

In topology 
Cofibrations are an awkward class of maps from a computational perspective because they are more easily seen as a formal technical tool which enables one to "do" homotopy theoretic constructions with topological spaces. Fortunately, for any map

of topological spaces, there is an associated cofibration to a space  called the mapping cylinder (where  is a deformation retract of, hence homotopy equivalent to it) which has an induced cofibration called replacing a map with a cofibration

and a map  through which  factors through, meaning there is a commutative diagram

where  is a homotopy equivalence.

In addition to this class of examples, there are
A frequently used fact is that a cellular inclusion is a cofibration (so, for instance, if  is a CW pair, then  is a cofibration). This follows from the previous fact since  is a cofibration for every , and pushouts are the gluing maps to the  skeleton. 
Cofibrations are preserved under pushouts and composition, which is stated precisely below.

In chain complexes 

Semi-simplicial sets 
For the category  of semi-simplicial setspg 1.3 (meaning there are no co-degeneracy maps going up in degree), there is a model category structure with fibrations given by Kan-fibrations, cofibrations injective maps, and weak equivalences given by weak equivalences after geometric realization.

Properties
 For Hausdorff spaces, every cofibration is a closed inclusion (injective with closed image); the result also generalizes to weak Hausdorff spaces.
 The pushout of a cofibration is a cofibration.
By the universal property of the pushout,  is a cofibration precisely when a mapping cylinder can be constructed for every space X.
 Every map can be replaced by a cofibration via the mapping cylinder construction.  That is, given an arbitrary (continuous) map  (between compactly generated spaces), one defines the mapping cylinder
.
One then decomposes  into the composite of a cofibration and a homotopy equivalence.  That is,  can be written as the map 

 Similar equivalences can be stated for deformation-retract pairs, and for neighborhood deformation-retract pairs.

Constructions with cofibrations

Cofibrant replacement 
Note that in a model category  if  is not a cofibration, then the mapping cylinder  forms a cofibrant replacement. In fact, if we work in just the category of topological spaces, the cofibrant replacement for any map from a point to a space forms a cofibrant replacement.

Cofiber 
For a cofibration  we define the cofiber to be the induced quotient space . Homotopically, the cofiber acts as a homotopy cokernel of the map . In fact, for pointed topological spaces, the homotopy colimit ofIn fact, the sequence of maps  comes equipped with the cofiber sequence which acts like a distinguished triangle in triangulated categories.

See also 

 Fibration
Homotopy colimit
Homotopy fiber

References

Peter May, "A Concise Course in Algebraic Topology" : chapter 6 defines and discusses cofibrations, and they are used throughout
  Chapter 7 has many results not found elsewhere.

Homotopical algebra
Homotopy theory